Justicia austroguangxiensis is a plant in the family Acanthaceae.

References 

austroguangxiensis